Chris Patton (born November 20, 1967) is an American professional golfer, best known for his large size and for winning the 1989 U.S. Amateur.

Early life
Patton was born in Fountain Inn, South Carolina. He played college golf at Clemson University where he won five events and was a three-time All-American. While at Clemson, he won the 1989 U.S. Amateur at Merion Golf Club. The win earned him invitations to the first three majors in 1990. He finished as the low amateur (T-39) at the Masters Tournament. He turned professional after the 1990 U.S. Amateur.

Professional career
Patton played on the Nationwide Tour from 1993 to 1995, winning once at the 1993 Nike New Mexico Charity Classic. He also played on the Canadian Tour, the PGA Tour of Australasia, and the NGA Hooters Tour, winning once on each tour.

In 2012, Patton was part of the reality show Chasing The Dream on the Golf Channel and was featured as Robbie Biershenk's friend and caddie during the 9-episode miniseries.

Patton returned to competitive golf for the first time in 14 years at the 2018 U.S. Senior Open, as he earned his exemption via the one-time exemption offered to former U.S. Amateur winners that have turned professional when they turn 50.

Amateur wins
1989 U.S. Amateur

Professional wins (4)

PGA Tour of Australasia wins (1)

Nike Tour wins (1)

Canadian Tour wins (1)

NGA Hooters Tour wins (1)
2003 Air Medal-Match-Shoot Out

Results in major championships

LA = Low amateur
CUT = missed the half-way cut
WD = Withdrew
"T" = tied
Note: Patton never played in the PGA Championship.

References

External links

Clemson Tigers profile

American male golfers
Clemson Tigers men's golfers
PGA Tour golfers
PGA Tour of Australasia golfers
Golfers from South Carolina
People from Fountain Inn, South Carolina
1967 births
Living people